Hang Hau is a residential area in Tseung Kwan O, Sai Kung, New Territories, Hong Kong. It is located at the eastern edge of the Tseung Kwan O New Town. Most of the land was reclaimed from Hang Hau Village and Shui Bin Village.

History 
The earliest history referring to Hang Hau was in the 19th century. It was an agricultural and fishing village. Hang Hau got its name from a large water channel near Mang Kung Uk that led to the sea. In days gone by, Hang Hau was on the sea front, facing Junk Bay. Many of the village names in Hang Hau reflect this – Shui Bin Village means Waterside Village, for example.

On 2 October 1957, Hang Hau Rural Committee was established. The rural committee was to serve the indigenous inhabitants in Hang Hau Village, Shui Bin Village, Tin Ha Wan Village, Yau Yue Wan Village, Tseng Lan Shue, Tai Po Tsai, Mang Kung Uk and Po Toi O.

Between the 1960s and 1980s, Hang Hau was a large ship scrapyard area. Since there was a ferry from Junk Bay to Island East Hong Kong, Hong Kong Oxygen Company started building factories in Hang Hau. Manufacturing business and trading services were established.

Long before the development of Tseung Kwan O New Town, Hang Hau was near settlements such as Hang Hau Village, Boon Kin Village and Tin Ha Wan Village. Most of the Villages were relocated at the current site near the Tseung Kwan O Hospital, which were moved after the new town's development. Now, about two-thirds of Hang Hau is on reclaimed land, and the sea is far away.

Housing
Indigenous three storey village houses still can be found in the eastern edge of Hang Hau. Nowadays, Hang Hau is fully built-out with private and public estates owing to the development of Tseung Kwan O New Town.

Villages

 Boon Kin Village
 Hang Hau Village
 Shui Bin Village
 Tin Ha Wan Village

Home Ownership Scheme Estates
 Chung Ming Court
 Hin Ming Court
 Wo Ming Court
 Yu Ming Court
 Yuk Ming Court

Private Sector Participation Scheme (PSPS) Estates
 Fu Ning Garden
 Jolly Place
 On Ning Garden

Public Estates
 Hau Tak Estate
 Ming Tak Estate

Private Estates
 East Point City
 Maritime Bay
 Residence Oasis
 La Cite Noble
 Nan Fung Plaza

Infrastructures

Civil Facilities
 Po Ning Road General Outpatient Clinic
 Sai Kung Tseung Kwan O Government Complex
 Tseung Kwan O Hospital

Recreations
 Hang Hau Sports Centre
 Hang Hau Man Kuk Lane Park
 Tseung Kwan O Sports Ground
 Hong Kong Velodrome

Shopping Malls
 East Point City
 TKO Gateway (formerly Hau Tak Shopping Centre)
 Nan Fung Plaza
 The Lane (MTR Malls)
 La Cite Noble
 Maritime Bay

Temple
Hang Hau Tin Hau Temple

Church
 St Andrew's Church

Institutes

Primary schools
Assembly of God Leung Sing Tak Primary School
PLK Fung Ching Memorial Primary School 
Tseung Kwan O Government Primary School
Yan Chai Hospital Chan Iu Seng Primary School

Secondary schools
Catholic Ming Yuen Secondary School
H.K.M.L.C. Queen Maud Secondary School
PLK Ho Yuk Ching (1984) College

See also 

 Hang Hau station 
 Tseung Kwan O
 Tseung Kwan O New Town
 Sai Kung District

References 

 
Areas of Hong Kong
Sai Kung District
Tseung Kwan O